John Milton Glover (June 23, 1852 – October 20, 1929) was a U.S. Representative from Missouri, nephew of John Montgomery Glover.

Biography
Born in St. Louis, Missouri, Glover attended the public schools of his native city and Washington University in St. Louis, Missouri.
He studied law and commenced practice in St. Louis.

Glover was elected as a Democrat to the Forty-ninth and Fiftieth Congresses (March 4, 1885 – March 3, 1889).

He was not a candidate for renomination in 1888, having become a candidate for the Democratic gubernatorial nomination, in which he was unsuccessful.
He then returned to the practice of law in St. Louis, Missouri, until 1909, when he moved to Denver, Colorado, and continued the practice of his profession until incapacitated by ill health in 1926.
He died aged 77, in Pueblo, Colorado, October 20, 1929.

He was interred in Bellefontaine Cemetery, St. Louis, Missouri. Representative Glover is the namesake of the community of Glover, Missouri.

Notes and references

1852 births
1929 deaths
Washington University in St. Louis alumni
Missouri lawyers
Colorado lawyers
Democratic Party members of the United States House of Representatives from Missouri
19th-century American lawyers
19th-century American politicians
20th-century American lawyers
Burials at Bellefontaine Cemetery